Mike Jeffrey McCarville is a Canadian curler from Thunder Bay, Ontario. He currently plays third on Team Trevor Bonot.

Career
McCarville played lead for Team Northern Ontario, skipped by Joe Scharf, at the Canadian Junior Curling Championships in 1999 and 2000, finishing with a 7–5 record and missing playoffs both times. In 2014, he won the Northern Ontario Men's Provincials as the third for Jeff Currie, qualifying for the 2014 Tim Hortons Brier. There, the team finished with a 2–9 record. On the World Curling Tour, McCarville has won the 2013 Bernick's Miller Lite Open.

McCarville has represented Northern Ontario in three Canadian Mixed Curling Championships, playing second each time. In 2005, his team, skipped by Joe Scharf, finished with a 5–6 record and out of playoffs. In 2008, he played for skip Mike Assad, finishing with a 6–5 record and out of playoffs. In 2019, he played for Trevor Bonot and finished the round robin with a 3–3 record, failing to advance to the championship pool. They finished the seeding pool with a 5–4 record. McCarville also won a sportsmanship award at the 2019 championship.

Personal life
McCarville is married to curler Krista McCarville.

References

External links

Canadian male curlers
Living people
Curlers from Thunder Bay
Year of birth missing (living people)